Holy Trinity Church, St Austell is a Grade I listed parish church in the Church of England in St Austell, Cornwall.

History

The church was originally dedicated to St Austol, a Breton saint associated with St Meven, but is now dedicated to the Holy Trinity. By 1150 it had been appropriated to the Priory of Tywardreath by the Cardinhams, a situation which continued until 1535. There was originally a Norman church here, of which some remains may be seen. The present church is of the 15th century and is large because the mediaeval parish was also a large one: the tower is impressive. All four outside walls bear sculptural groups in carved niches: the Twelve Apostles in three groups on the north, east and south; the Holy Trinity above the Annunciation and below that the Risen Christ between two saints on the west. The tower can be dated to between 1478 and 1487 by the arms of Bishop Peter Courtenay, and the walls are faced in Pentewan stone.  The tower and other parts of the church have an interior lining of granite. On the south side of the church, a formerly separate chantry was incorporated into the church when it was extended.

The church was restored in 1872 by George Edmund Street. Additional work was undertaken by the architect George Fellowes Prynne between 1896 and 1924. The tower was restored in 1896 at a cost of £300, as well as the restoration of a Chapel, and work to the baptistry between 1892 and 1894.

In 1891, murals by the late Pre-Raphaelite artist Edward Arthur Fellowes Prynne, were painted on east side of the main chancel window. Prynne was the brother of the George Fellowes Prynne, and the work was carried out in 1891 as a memorial to John Coode, of Polcarne, and his daughter, Evelyn Carey — a plaque behind the pier adjacent to the organ recorded this donation. The work was carried out by Messrs. Fouracre and Watson, of Stonehouse, Plymouth, from Prynne's designs. The two panels represent the Nativity and the Lord's Supper. "The painting of the side walls and the decoration of the roof, including the illuminated oaken arch, were executed at the same time by the same firm, and under the same direction".

Parish status

The church is in a joint parish with
St Levan’s Church, Porthpean
All Saints’ Church, Pentewan

Organ

The organ was built by Henry Bryceson and Brothers in 1880  at a cost of £600. It was later modified by Hele & Co in 1914 and Maurice Eglinton in 1973. A specification of the organ can be found on the National Pipe Organ Register.

References

Saint Austell
Saint Austell
St Austell